In 1996 H.T. Odum defined transformity as,
"the emergy of one type required to make a unit of energy of another type. For example, since 3 coal emjoules (cej) of coal and 1 cej of services are required to generate 1 J of electricity, the coal transformity of electricity is 4 cej/J"

The concept of transformity was first introduced by David M. Scienceman in collaboration with Howard T. Odum. In 1987 Scienceman proposed that the phrases, "energy quality", "energy quality factor", and "energy transformation ratio", all used by H.T.Odum, be replaced by the word "transformity" (p. 261). This approach aims to solve a long-standing issue about the relation of qualitative phenomena to quantitative phenomena often analysed in the physical sciences, which in turn is a synthesis of rationalism with phenomenology. That is to say that it aims to quantify quality.

Transformity: the rationalization of quality

Definition of transformity in words 

Scienceman then defined transformity as,
"a quantitative variable describing the measurable property of a form of energy, its ability to amplify as feedback, relative to the source energy consumed in its formation, under maximum power conditions. As a quantitative variable analogous to thermodynamic temperature, transformity requires specification of units." (1987, p. 261. My emphasis).
In 1996 H.T.Odum defined transformity as,
"the emergy of one type required to make a unit of energy of another type. For example, since 3 coal emjoules (cej) of coal and 1 cej of services are required to generate 1 J of electricity, the coal transformity of electricity is 4 cej/J"
G.P.Genoni expanded on this definition and maintained that, "the energy input of one kind required to sustain one unit of energy of another kind, is used to quantify hierarchical position" (1997, p. 97). According to Scienceman, the concept of transformity introduces a new basic dimension into physics (1987, p. 261). However, there is ambiguity in the dimensional analysis of transformity as Bastianoni et al. (2007) state that transformity is a dimensionless ratio.

Definition as a ratio 

One part of the rationalist viewpoint associated with modernity and science is to contrast qualitatively different phenomena under transformation through quantitative ratios, with the aim of uncovering any constancy amidst the transformation change. Like the efficiency ratio, transformity is quantitatively defined by a simple input-output ratio. However the transformity ratio is the inverse of efficiency and involves both indirect and direct energy flows rather than simply direct input-output energy ratio of energy efficiency. This is to say that it is defined as the ratio of emergy input to energy output.

Original version::

Development 

However, it was realised that the term "energy output" refers to both the useful energy output and the non-useful energy output. (Note: that as given by P.K.Nag, an alternative name for 'useful energy' is 'availability' or exergy, and an alternative name for 'non-useful energy' is 'unavailability', or anergy (Nag 1984, p. 156)). But as E.Sciubba and S.Ulgiati observed, the notion of transformity meant to capture the emergy invested per unit product, or useful output. The concept of Transformity was therefore further specified as the ratio of "input emergy dissipated (availability used up)" to the "unit output exergy" (Sciubba and Ulgiati 2005, p. 1957). For Jørgensen (2000, p. 61) transformity is a strong indicator of the efficiency of the system.

Revised version:  or 
(after Giannantoni 2002, p. 8).

Substituting in the mathematical definition of emergy given in that article.

Contemporary development

Two transformities

 : compensates for the dissipation of exergy, and is defined in words as the Quality Factor which takes into account the emerging Quality associated to other forms of Energy
 : accounts for the increase of Transformity as a consequence of the Emergy generated by the Source Terms of the Universe

Under these definitions "emergy" can always be structured as follows:

References
B.R. Bakshi (2000) 'A thermodynamic framework for ecologically conscious process systems engineering', Computers and Chemical Engineering 24, pp. 1767–1773.
S.Bastianoni (2000) 'The problem of co-production in environmental accounting by emergy analysis', Ecological Modelling 129, pp. 187–193.
S.Bastianoni, F.M.Pulselli, M.Rustici (2006) Exergy versus emergy flow in ecosystems: Is there an order in maximizations?', Ecological Indicators 6, pp. 58–62
S.Bastianoni, A. Facchini, L. Susani, E. Tiezzi (2007) 'Emergy as a function of exergy', Energy 32, 1158–1162.
 M.T. Brown and S. Ulgiati (2004) Energy quality, emergy, and transformity: H.T. Odum's contributions to quantifying and understanding systems, Ecological Modelling, Vol. 178, pp. 201–213. 
 T.T.Cai, T.W.Olsen and D.E.Campbell (2004) Maximum (em)power: A foundational principle linking man and nature', Ecological Modelling, Volume 178, Issue 1–2, pp. 115–119.
 D.E.Campbell (2001) Proposal for including what is valuable to ecosystems in environmental assessments', Environmental Science and Technology, Volume 35, Issue 14, pp. 2867–2873.  
 G.Q. Chen (2006) 'Scarcity of exergy and ecological evaluation based on embodied exergy', Communications in Nonlinear Science and Numerical Simulation, 11, pp. 531–552
 B.D.Fath, B.C.Patten, and J.S.Choi (2001) Complementarity of ecological goal functions', Journal of Theoretical Biology, Volume 208, Issue 4, pp. 493–506.
 G.P. Genoni (1997) 'Towards a conceptual synthesis in ecotoxicology', OIKOS, 80:1, pp. 96–106.
 G.P. Genoni, E.I. Meyer and A.Ulrich (2003) 'Energy flow and elemental concentrations in the Steina River ecosystem (Black Forest,Germany)', Aquat. Sci., Vol. 65, pp. 143–157.  
 C.Giannantoni (2000) 'Toward a Mathematical Formulation of the Maximum Em-Power Principle', in M.T.Brown (ed.) Emergy Synthesis: Theory and applications of the emergy methodology, Proceedings from the first biennial emergy analysis research conference, The Center for Environmental Policy, Department of Environmental Engineering Sciences, University of Florida, Gainesville, FL.
 C.Giannantoni (2002) The Maximum Em-Power Principle as the basis for Thermodynamics of Quality, Servizi Grafici Editoriali, Padova. 
 C.Giannantoni (2006) 'Mathematics for generative processes: Living and non-living systems' Journal of Computational and Applied Mathematics 189, pp. 324–340.
 Shu-Li Huang and Chia-Wen Chen (2005) 'Theory of urban energetics and mechanisms of urban development', Ecological Modelling, 189, pp. 49–71.
 J.L.Hau and B.R.Bakshi (2004) 'Promise and Problems of Emergy Analysis', Ecological Modelling, special issue in honor of H. T. Odum, vol. 178, pp. 215–225.
 S.E. Jorgensen, S.N.Nielsen, H.Mejer (1995) 'Emergy, environ, exergy and ecological modelling', Ecological Modelling, 77, pp. 99–109
 S.E. Jorgensen. (2000) Thermodynamics and Ecological Modelling, CRC Press.
 J.Laganisa, & M.Debeljakb (2006) 'Sensitivity analysis of the emergy flows at the solar salt production process in Slovenia', Journal of Ecological Modelling, 194, pp. 287–295.
 A.Lourenci and J.A. Zuffo 2004 Incipient Emergy expresses the self-organization generative activity of man-made ecomimetic systems, in Ortega, E. & Ulgiati, S. (editors): Advances in Energy Studies, Proceedings of IV Biennial International Workshop, Unicamp, Campinas, SP, Brazil. June 16–19, 2004. Pages 409–417. 
 P.K.Nag (1984) Engineering Thermodynamics, Tata McGraw-Hill Publishing Company.
 H.T.Odum (1986) in N.Polunin, Ed. Ecosystem Theory and Application, Wiley, New York.
 H.T.Odum (1988) 'Self-Organization, Transformity, and Information', Science, Vol. 242, pp. 1132–1139.
 H.T.Odum (1995) 'Self-Organization and Maximum Empower', in C.A.S.Hall (ed.) Maximum Power; The Ideas and Applications of H.T.Odum, Colorado University Press, Colorado, pp. 311–330. 
 H.T.Odum (1996) Environmental Accounting: Emergy and Environmental Decision Making, Wiley.
 H.T.Odum (2002) 'Material circulation, energy hierarchy, and building construction', in C.J.Kibert, J.Sendzimir, and G.B.Guy (eds) Construction Ecology; Nature as the basis for green buildings, Spon Press, New York.
 H.T.Odum and E.C.Odum (1983)Energy Analysis Overview of Nations, Working Paper, WP-83-82. Laxenburg, Austria: International Institute of Applied System Analysis. 469 pp. (CFW-83-21)
 H.T.Odum and E.C.Odum (2000) A Prosperous way Down: Principles and Policies, Colorado University Press, Colorado.
 D.M.Scienceman (1987) 'Energy and Emergy.' In G. Pillet and T. Murota (eds), Environmental Economics: The Analysis of a Major Interface. Geneva: R. Leimgruber. pp. 257–276. (CFW-86-26)
 D.M. Scienceman (1989) ' The Emergence of Emonomics'. In Proceedings of the International Society for General Systems Research Conference (July 2–7, 1989), Edinburgh, Scotland, 7 pp. (CFW-89-02).
 D.M. Scienceman (1991) Emergy and Energy: The Form and Content of Ergon. Discussion paper. Gainesville: Center for Wetlands, University of Florida. 13 pp. (CFW-91-10)
 D.M. Scienceman (1992) Emvalue and Lavalue, Paper Prepared for th Annual Meeting of The International Society for the Systems Sciences, University of Denver, Denver, Colorado, U.S.A.
 D.M. Scienceman (1997) 'Letters to the Editor: Emergy definition', Ecological Engineering, 9, pp. 209–212.
 E. Sciubba, S. Ulgiatib (2005) 'Emergy and exergy analyses: Complementary methods or irreducible ideological options?' Energy 30, pp. 1953–1988.
 S.E.Tennenbaum (1988) Network Energy Expenditures for Subsystem Production, MS Thesis. Gainesville, FL: University of FL, 131 pp. (CFW-88-08)
 S.Ulgiati, H.T.Odum, S.Bastianoni (1994) 'Emergy use, environmental loading and sustainability. An emergy analysis of Italy', Ecological Modelling, Volume 73, Issue 3–4, Pages 215–268.
 S.Ulgiati and M.T.Brown (1999)  Emergy evaluation of natural capital and biosphere services.
 S.Ulgiati and M.T.Brown  (2001) 'Emergy Accounting of Human-Dominated, Large-Scale Ecosystems', in S.E.Jorgensen (ed) Thermodynamics and Ecological Modelling, CRC Press LLC, pp. 63–113.

Transformity